This list of bullion dealers includes notable companies and organizations that deal in precious metals, such as gold and silver.

References

bullion